The Terra Firma Islands are a small group of islands lying  north of Cape Berteaux, off the west coast of Graham Land in West Antarctica. Roughly surveyed by the British Graham Land Expedition (BGLE) in 1936. The name "Terra Firma Island" was applied to the largest island (Alamode Island, q.v.), because a BGLE depot-laying party camped there following the break-up of sea ice, but the name Terra Firma Islands was later applied to the whole group. They include Dumbbell Island.

The Terra Firma islands are the southernmost point in the world where grass (Deschampsia antarctica) and flowers (Colobanthus quitensis) grow naturally.

See also 
 List of Antarctic and sub-Antarctic islands

References 

Islands of Graham Land
Fallières Coast